Boulder Municipal Airport  is a public airport located  northeast of the central business district of Boulder, a city in Boulder County, Colorado, United States. It is owned by the City of Boulder and used almost exclusively for general aviation. Its location in the foothills of the Rockies east of the continental divide gives excellent conditions for soaring, and there is extensive gliding activity. It is the base of the Soaring Society of Boulder.

Most U.S. airports use the same three-letter location identifier for the FAA and IATA, but Boulder Municipal is BDU (formerly 1V5) to the FAA and WBU to the IATA (which assigned BDU to Bardufoss Airport in Bardufoss, Norway).

Facilities

 Runway 8/26: 4,100 x 75 ft (1,250 x 23 m), surface: asphalt
 Runway 8G/26G: 4,100 x 25 ft (1,250 x 8 m), surface: asphalt/turf

In 2005 the airport had 59,379 aircraft operations, average 162 per day: 99% general aviation, 1% air taxi and <1% military. 220 aircraft are based at this airport: 64% single engine, 23% glider, 11% multi-engine, 1% helicopters, <1% jet aircraft and <1% ultralight.

The airport has an executive terminal, which is operated by Journeys Aviation.

See also
 List of airports in the Denver area

References

External links 
 Boulder Municipal Airport at City of Boulder website
 Boulder Municipal Airport (BDU) at Colorado DOT airport directory
 Journeys Aviation
 Soaring Society of Boulder at Soaring Society of Boulder website
 

Airports in Colorado
Transportation buildings and structures in Boulder County, Colorado